This list of biomedical science awards is an index to articles on notable awards for biomedical sciences, a set of sciences applying portions of natural science or formal science, or both, to  knowledge, interventions, or technology that are of use in health care or public health.

Awards

See also

 Lists of awards
 Lists of science and technology awards
 List of biology awards
 List of medicine awards

References

 
biomedicine